Fox Lake 162 is an Indian reserve of the Little Red River Cree Nation in Alberta, located within Mackenzie County. Centered on the unincorporated community of Fox Lake, it is 13 kilometers northwest of Little Red River.

References

Mackenzie County
Indian reserves in Alberta
Cree reserves and territories